Sonasar is a village in Jhunjhunu District in Rajasthan, India. The village was founded by Sona Ram Jat of Bhadia gotra in 1616, who gave the name Sonasar to the village.

The area of the village is 18000 bigha. There are four temples in the village, one of which honors Gogaji.and DADA THAN temple (Basera ka bas)

Villages in Jhunjhunu district